Pikhtovo is a rural locality (a settlement) in Lomovatskoye Rural Settlement, Velikoustyugsky District, Vologda Oblast, Russia. The population was 91 as of 2002.

Geography 
Pikhtovo is located 93 km northwest of Veliky Ustyug (the district's administrative centre) by road. Ilatovskaya is the nearest rural locality.

References 

Rural localities in Velikoustyugsky District